Greylock may refer to:

Gray Lock or Greylock, a Western Abenaki Missisquoi chief
Greylock Capital Management, an asset management firm
Greylock Partners, a venture capital firm
Camp Greylock, a summer camp in Becket, Massachusetts
Mount Greylock, the highest natural point in Massachusetts
Mount Greylock State Reservation, a forest preserve in Massachusetts
Greylock Mountain, within the Sawtooth Range, near Atlanta, Idaho
Greylock, the main character in the comic Grey Legacy
Greylock, a fictional New Hampshire town in the TV series The Republic of Sarah
Jack Greylock, a main character in the film Between Friends and the eponymous novel it was based on

See also
 
 Grayleck